David S. Olsen (born September 13, 1988) was Republican member of the Illinois House of Representatives from 2016 to 2019.

Republican incumbent Ron Sandack resigned from the Illinois House of Representatives effective July 25, 2016. Local Republican leaders met and appointed Olsen to the seat. Olsen was sworn into office July 30, 2016.

In 2018, Olsen narrowly lost reelection to Democratic candidate Anne Stava-Murray. In 2019, Olsen ran for mayor of Downers Grove, but lost. He was also the Vice Chair of the College of DuPage Board of Trustees, a position to which he was appointed in 2016 by Illinois Community College Board Chairman Lazaro Lopez.

References

External links 
 Profile at Illinois General Assembly

Living people
People from Downers Grove, Illinois
Republican Party members of the Illinois House of Representatives
21st-century American politicians
1988 births